Internatsionalnoye is a former village and located in the Mamlyut District in North Kazakhstan Region of Kazakhstan.  It was abolished in the 2000s.

References

Populated places in North Kazakhstan Region
Former populated places in Kazakhstan